Grand Jamia Mosque, is a cultural complex under construction in Bahria Town Karachi, Pakistan. When completed, the complex will include what would be Pakistan's largest and the world's third-largest mosque according to capacity. The mosque will be able to accommodate 800,000 worshippers at a time.

Design 
The design is a blend of Mughal and Persian architecture. The design includes a  single-monument minaret. The Mosque contains 150 domes in total. Height of the largest single dome is 75 meters. High quality beige-coloured marble from Balochistan is used in the construction. The complex will be surrounded by large gardens surrounded by arch-shaped walls on all four sides.

The mosque will have fountains within the courtyard. To protect worshippers from the sun, the courtyard will have automated umbrellas similar in design to the ones in Al-Masjid an-Nabawi.

Gallery

See also
List of largest mosques
Islamic architecture
Architecture of Pakistan
List of mosques in Pakistan
Wazir Khan Mosque
Grand Jamia Mosque, Lahore

References

Mosques in Karachi
Bahria Town
Grand mosques